Rafael José Fernandes Teixeira Vieira, known as Rafael Vieira or Rafa Vieira (born 9 July 1992)  is a Portuguese footballer who plays for Nacional.

Club career
He made his professional debut in the Segunda Liga for Vitória Guimarães B on 18 August 2012 in a game against Sporting B.

On 9 June 2021, he moved to Nacional on a two-year contract.

References

External links

1992 births
Sportspeople from Braga
Living people
Portuguese footballers
Association football defenders
G.D. Ribeirão players
Vitória S.C. B players
A.D. Lousada players
GD Bragança players
S.C. Covilhã players
S.C. Farense players
Associação Académica de Coimbra – O.A.F. players
C.D. Nacional players
Liga Portugal 2 players
Campeonato de Portugal (league) players